A schedule is a time management tool consisting of a list of times at which events are to occur, or an order in which they are to occur. 

Schedule may also refer to:

Business and work
 Schedule (project management), including activities not related to time such as resource or risk management
 Schedule (workplace), means of planning resource schedules for work
 Scheduling (production processes), methods of planning for manufacturing purposes
 Master production schedule, a plan for individual commodities to produce
 Scheduled maintenance, list of routine maintenance activities, usually with point at which they should be performed
 Executive Schedule, pay scales within the U.S. government
 General Schedule, pay scales within the U.S. government
 Transport scheduling, calculation of public transport timetables.

Computing
 Scheduling (computing), the assignment of tasks to computing resources. For example: the assignment of processes to machines.
 Schedule (computer science), a list of actions from a set of transactions in databases
 Key schedule, cryptographic method and setup of code key

Other uses
 Instrument Schedule, a listing of show equipment and information such as location and gear plan 
 Drug schedule, listing drugs into different categories
 Schedule of reinforcement, selection of method for training
 Integrated Master Schedule, a supplement to Integrated Master Plan with durations, relationships, and links to WBS and SOW
 Schedules of concessions in international trade law

See also
 Scheduler (disambiguation)
 Calendar (disambiguation)